The James Robertson Hotel is a historic hotel and apartment building in Nashville, Tennessee, USA. It has been listed on the National Register of Historic Places since October 10, 1984.

References

Hotel buildings on the National Register of Historic Places in Tennessee
Art Deco architecture in Tennessee
Hotel buildings completed in 1929
Hotels in Nashville, Tennessee
National Register of Historic Places in Nashville, Tennessee